Scott Doohan (born 24 May 1963) is an Australian former motorcycle racer. He is Mick Doohan's brother.

Career statistics

Superbike World Championship

Races by year
(key)

Grand Prix motorcycle racing

By season

Races by year
(key)

References

External links
 Profile on MotoGP.com

Australian motorcycle racers
1963 births
Living people
Motorcycle racers from Brisbane
500cc World Championship riders
Superbike World Championship riders